Jalalabad is a village in the Muzaffargarh District of Punjab, Pakistan. It is located at 30°1'0N 71°8'0E with an altitude of 109 metres (360 feet).

References

Populated places in Muzaffargarh District